The 42nd Kerala Film Critics Association Awards, honouring the best Malayalam films released in 2018, were announced in April 2019.

Winners

Main Awards 
 Best Film: Oru Kuprasidha Payyan
 Best Director: Shaji N. Karun (Oolu)
 Best Actor: Mohanlal (Odiyan)
 Best Actress: Nimisha Sajayan (Oru Kuprasidha Payyan) and Anusree (Aanakkallan, Aadhi)
 Second Best Film: Joseph
 Second Best Actor: Joju George (Joseph)
 Second Best Actress: Iniya (Parole), (Pengalila)
 Best Screenplay: Mubi Huque (Khaleefa)
 Best Music Director: Kailas Menon (Theevandi)
 Best Lyricist: Rajeev Alunkal
 Best Male Playback Singer: Rakesh Brahmanandan (Pen Masala)
 Best Female Playback Singer: Resmi Sateesh (Ee Mazhanilavil)
 Best Debutant – Male: Pranav Mohanlal (Aadhi)
 Best Debutant – Female: Audrey Miriam
 Best Child Artist: Master Rithun, Baby Akshara Kishore
 Best Environmental Film: Samaksham (Director: Aju K.Narayanan)

Special Jury Awards
 Special Jury Award for Acting: M.A. Nishad: Vaaku

Honourary Awards 
 Chalachitra Ratnam Award: Sheela
 Chalachitra Prathibha Award: Kaithapram Damodaran, P. Sreekumar, Lalu Alex, Menaka, Bhagyalakshmi

References

External links
 "List of recipients of the Kerala Film Critics Association Awards" (in Malayalam)
 "Kerala Film Critics Association Awards 2018: Official press release" (in Malayalam)

2018 Indian film awards
2018